Teresa Trzebunia (born 23 September 1934) is a Polish cross-country skier. She competed in three events at the 1964 Winter Olympics.

Cross-country skiing results

Olympic Games

References

External links
 

1934 births
Living people
Polish female cross-country skiers
Olympic cross-country skiers of Poland
Cross-country skiers at the 1964 Winter Olympics
Sportspeople from Zakopane